The Sporting News is a website and former magazine publication owned by Sporting News Holdings, which is a U.S.-based sports media company formed in December 2020 by a private investor consortium. It was originally established in 1886 as a print magazine. It became the dominant American publication covering baseball, acquiring the nickname "The Bible of Baseball."

From 2002 to February 2022, it was known simply as Sporting News. In December 2012, Sporting News ended print publication and shifted to a digital-only publication. It currently has editions in the United States, Canada, Australia, and Japan.

History

Early history 
March 17, 1886: The Sporting News (TSN), founded in St. Louis  by Alfred H. Spink, a director of the St. Louis Browns baseball team, publishes its first edition. The weekly newspaper sells for 5 cents. Baseball, horse racing and professional wrestling received the most coverage in the first issue. Meanwhile, the sporting weeklies Clipper and Sporting Life were based in New York and Philadelphia. By World War I, TSN would be the only national baseball newspaper.
1901: The American League, another rival to baseball's National League, begins playing. TSN was a vocal supporter of the new league and its founder, Ban Johnson. Both parties advocated cleaning up the sport, in particular ridding it of liquor sales, gambling and assaults on umpires.
1903: TSN editor Arthur Flanner helps draft the National Agreement, a document that brought a truce between the AL and NL and helped bring about the modern World Series.
1904: New York photographer Charles Conlon begins taking portraits of major league players as they pass through the city's three ballparks: the Polo Grounds, Yankee Stadium and Ebbets Field. His images, many of which were featured in TSN, have become treasured symbols of baseball's past.
1914: Alfred's son, J.G. Taylor Spink, takes over the paper.
1936: TSN names its first major league Sporting News Player of the Year Award, Carl Hubbell of the New York Giants. It is the oldest and most prestigious award given to the single player in MLB who had the most outstanding season. To this day, it remains voted on by MLB players.
1942: After decades of being intertwined with baseball, TSN adds in-season football coverage.
1946: TSN expands its football coverage with an eight-page tabloid publication titled The Quarterback. The tab is later renamed the All-Sports News as coverage of other sports is added, including professional and college basketball and hockey.
1962: J.G. Taylor Spink dies. His son C.C. Johnson Spink takes over the publication. In 1962, after Spink's death, the Baseball Writers' Association of America (BBWAA) instituted the J. G. Taylor Spink Award as the highest award given to its members. Spink was also the first recipient.
1967: TSN publishes its first full-color photo, a cover image of Orioles star Frank Robinson.
1977: The Spink family sells TSN to Times Mirror in 1977.
1981: C.C. Johnson Spink sells TSN to Tribune Company.
1991: The Sporting News transitions to a glossy, full-color all-sports magazine.
1996: The Sporting News comes online, serving as a sports content provider for AOL. The following year, it launches sportingnews.com.
2000: Tribune Company sells TSN to Vulcan Inc., headed by tech billionaire Paul Allen. The following year, the company acquired the One on One Sports radio network, renaming it Sporting News Radio.
2002: The magazine drops the definite article from its name and becomes just Sporting News (SN). Subsequent covers reflect the change.
2006: Vulcan sells SN to Advance Media, which places the publication under the supervision of American City Business Journals (ACBJ).
2007: Sporting News begins its move from St. Louis, where it had been based since its founding, to ACBJ's headquarters in Charlotte, N.C. The publication leaves St. Louis for good in 2008, when it also became a bi-weekly publication.

Transition to digital publication 
In 2011, Sporting News announced a deal to take over editorial control of AOL's sports website FanHouse. In December 2012, after 126 years, Sporting News published its final issue as a print publication, and shifted to becoming a digital-only publication.

The following March, ACBJ contributed Sporting News into a joint venture with the U.S. assets of sports data company Perform Group, known as Perform Sporting News Limited and doing business as Sporting News Media. Perform owned 65% of Sporting News Media. Sporting News would join Perform Group's other domestic properties, such as its video syndication unit ePlayer and its soccer website Goal.com. The deal excluded the magazine's Sporting News Yearbooks unit and NASCAR Illustrated.  Almost immediately after the venture was established, Sporting News laid off 13 staff writers. Perform Group acquired the remainder of Sporting News Media in 2015.

Under Perform's ownership, Sporting News shifted to a more tabloid-like editorial direction. The site introduced a new logo and website design in 2016. Following Perform's acquisition of ACBJ's remaining stake, it began to align itself more closely with the company's other units, including replacing Associated Press articles with Perform's own Omnisport wire service for articles and video content (which began to constitute a sizable portion of the site's overall content).  Sporting News also began to introduce new localized versions in other markets, with a focus on countries where it had launched its sports streaming service DAZN. These sites are, in turn, used to promote the DAZN service. Perform Media president Juan Delgado explained that the company was trying to preserve the heritage of the Sporting News brand by still publishing original content, while also publishing content oriented towards social media to appeal to younger users.

Later history
In September 2018, Perform Group spun out its consumer properties, including Sporting News and DAZN, into a new company known as DAZN Group. The remaining sports data business became Perform Content, and was sold in 2019 to Vista Equity Partners and merged with STATS LLC.

In the summer of 2020, Lindenwood University of St. Charles, Missouri, acquired the archives collection of The Sporting News from ACBJ. The collection was described as consisting of "10,000+ books on baseball, football, hockey, basketball, NCAA, and other sports."

In December 2020, DAZN Group sold Sporting News to a private investment consortium, which became Sporting News Holdings.

Athlete of the Year

Sportsman of the Year

From 1968 to 2008, the magazine selected one or more individuals as Sportsman of the Year. On four occasions, the award was shared by two recipients. Twice, in 1993 and 2000, the award went to a pair of sportsmen within the same organization. In 1999, the honor was given to a whole team. No winner was chosen in 1987.

On December 18, 2007, the magazine announced New England Patriots quarterback Tom Brady as 2007 Sportsman of the Year, making Brady the first to repeat as a recipient of individual honors. Mark McGwire of the St. Louis Cardinals was also honored twice, but shared his second award with Sammy Sosa of the Chicago Cubs.

In 2009, the award was replaced by two awards: "Pro Athlete of the Year" and "College Athlete of the Year".  These in turn were replaced by a singular "Athlete of the Year" award starting in 2011.

1968 – Denny McLain, Detroit Tigers
1969 – Tom Seaver, New York Mets
1970 – John Wooden, UCLA basketball
1971 – Lee Trevino, golf
1972 – Charlie Finley, Oakland A's
1973 – O. J. Simpson, Buffalo Bills
1974 – Lou Brock, St. Louis Cardinals
1975 – Archie Griffin, Ohio State football
1976 – Larry O'Brien, National Basketball Association commissioner
1977 – Steve Cauthen, horse racing
1978 – Ron Guidry, New York Yankees
1979 – Willie Stargell, Pittsburgh Pirates
1980 – George Brett, Kansas City Royals
1981 – Wayne Gretzky, Edmonton Oilers
1982 – Whitey Herzog, St. Louis Cardinals
1983 – Bowie Kuhn, Major League Baseball commissioner
1984 – Peter Ueberroth, Olympics organizer
1985 – Pete Rose, Cincinnati Reds
1986 – Larry Bird, Boston Celtics
1987 – (none)
1988 – Jackie Joyner-Kersee, Olympics
1989 – Joe Montana, San Francisco 49ers
1990 – Nolan Ryan, Texas Rangers
1991 – Michael Jordan, Chicago Bulls
1992 – Mike Krzyzewski, Duke basketball
1993 – Cito Gaston and Pat Gillick, Toronto Blue Jays
1994 – Emmitt Smith, Dallas Cowboys
1995 – Cal Ripken, Baltimore Orioles
1996 – Joe Torre, New York Yankees
1997 – Mark McGwire, St. Louis Cardinals
1998 – Mark McGwire, St. Louis Cardinals, and Sammy Sosa, Chicago Cubs (see also 1998 Major League Baseball home run record chase)
1999 – New York Yankees
2000 – Marshall Faulk and Kurt Warner, St. Louis Rams
2001 – Curt Schilling, Arizona Diamondbacks
2002 – Tyrone Willingham, Notre Dame football
2003 – Dick Vermeil, Kansas City Chiefs, and Jack McKeon, Florida Marlins
2004 – Tom Brady, New England Patriots
2005 – Matt Leinart, USC football
2006 – LaDainian Tomlinson, San Diego Chargers
2007 – Tom Brady, New England Patriots
2008 – Eli Manning, New York Giants

Pro Athlete of the Year
2009 – Mariano Rivera, New York Yankees
2010 – Roy Halladay, Philadelphia Phillies

College Athlete of the Year
2009 – Colt McCoy, Texas football
2010 – Kyle Singler, Duke men's basketball

Athlete of the Year
Beginning in 2011, the awards were merged back into a singular selection, Athlete of the Year.
2011 – Aaron Rodgers, Green Bay Packers
2012 – LeBron James, Miami Heat
2021 – Shohei Ohtani, Los Angeles Angels

Sport-specific awards

Major League Baseball

TSN sponsors its own annual Team, Player, Pitcher, Rookie, Reliever, Comeback Player, Manager, and Executive of the Year awards. Many fans once held the newspaper's baseball awards at equal or higher esteem than those of the Baseball Writers' Association of America. Prior to 2005, the SN Comeback Player Award was generally recognized as the principal award of its type, as MLB did not give such an award until that year.

The Sporting News Most Valuable Player Award (discontinued in 1946)
Sporting News Player of the Year (all positions; in MLB)
Sporting News Pitcher of the Year (in each league)
Sporting News Rookie of the Year (from 1963 through 2003, there were two categories: Rookie Pitcher of the Year and Rookie Player of the Year)
Sporting News Reliever of the Year (discontinued in 2011)
Sporting News Comeback Player of the Year
Sporting News Manager of the Year (in each league (1986–present); in MLB (1936–1985))
Sporting News Executive of the Year (in MLB)

Minor League Baseball
The Sporting News Minor League Player of the Year Award (1936–2007)

Basketball
Sporting News NBA Executive of the Year Award (1973–2008)
Sporting News Men's College Basketball Player of the Year
Sporting News Men’s College Basketball Coach of the Year Award

NFL
Sporting News NFL Player of the Year Award (1954–1969 and since 1980)
Sporting News AFC and NFC player of the year awards (1970–1979)
Sporting News NFL Rookie of the Year Award
Sporting News NFL Coach of the Year (since 1947)
Sporting News All-Pro Team (since 1980)
Sporting News All-Conference Team (from 1950s till 1979) (defunct)

College football awards
Sporting News College Football Player of the Year (1942)
Sporting News All-America Team (1934)
Sporting News College Football Coach of the Year

Also, between 1975 and 2005, Sporting News conducted an annual poll and named a national champion for Division I-A (now Division I FBS). It is regarded as a "major selector" in NCAA official records books.

Notable staff
 Thomas G. Osenton,  president and chief operating officer of Sporting News Publishing Company and publisher of The Sporting News weekly
 Bob Ferguson, journalist and author of Who's Who In Canadian Sport

Footnotes

External links

1886 establishments in Missouri
2012 disestablishments in North Carolina
American football mass media
Baseball magazines
Basketball magazines
Biweekly magazines published in the United States
College basketball mass media in the United States
College football mass media
Defunct magazines published in the United States
Magazines established in 1886
Magazines disestablished in 2012
Magazines published in North Carolina
Magazines published in St. Louis
National Hockey League mass media
Online magazines with defunct print editions
Sports magazines published in the United States
Webby Award winners
Weekly magazines published in the United States